The Intercontinental Cup (known as Toyota Cup 1980–2004) was an annual contest held between 1960 and 2004 and played between the previous season's UEFA Champions League and Copa Libertadores winners. From 1960 to 1979, the cup was played over two legs. Between 1960 and 1968, the cup was decided on points, which meant that a third play-off match was played when both teams were equal on points. From 1969 to 1979, the competition adopted the aggregate score method, with away goals. In 1980, the Toyota Motor Corporation assumed sponsorship of the contest, renaming it Toyota Cup and transforming it into a single-match contest, held at a neutral venue in Japan. From 1980 to 2001, the match was held at the National Olympic Stadium in Tokyo, and the last three – from 2002 to 2004 – were held at the International Stadium in Yokohama. The competition was then discontinued and merged into the FIFA Club World Cup, which was held for the first time in 2000.

The first cup was played in July and September 1960 between Spanish team Real Madrid and Uruguay's Peñarol. Real Madrid lifted the trophy under the guidance of manager Miguel Muñoz, winning 5–1 over two legs. The first single-match final was held in February 1981 and ended in success for Uruguayan side Nacional, led by Juan Mujica, who defeated England's Nottingham Forest 1–0. The last Intercontinental Cup was played on 12 December 2004 and was won by Porto of Portugal, who defeated Colombian side Once Caldas in a penalty shoot-out.

Argentine managers have fared most successfully in the contest, winning 11 titles. Carlos Bianchi won the title on three occasions and is the only manager to have won it with different clubs (with Vélez Sarsfield in 1994 and with Boca Juniors in 2000 and 2003).

Four managers have won two titles, each of them back-to-back and with the same club (Luís Alonso Pérez with Santos in 1962 and 1963, Helenio Herrera with Internazionale in 1964 and 1965, Arrigo Sacchi with Milan in 1989 and 1990 and Telê Santana with São Paulo in 1992 and 1993).

By year

Managers with multiple titles

Bold = Still active as manager

By nationality
This table lists the total number of titles won by managers of each nationality.

See also
Intercontinental Cup records and statistics
List of Copa Libertadores winning managers
List of European Cup and UEFA Champions League winning managers

References
General

Specific

 

 

Managers
Intercontinental Cup